The 8th Minnesota Territorial Legislature first convened on January 7, 1857. The 15 members of the Minnesota Territorial Council were elected during the General Election of October 9, 1855, and the 38 members of the Minnesota House of Representatives were elected during the General Election of October 14, 1856. The 8th territorial legislature was the final territorial legislature held before the Territory of Minnesota was dissolved and Minnesota was admitted as a state.

Sessions 
The territorial legislature met in a regular session from January 7, 1857 to March 7, 1857. A special session was convened from April 27, 1857 to May 25, 1857 to consider various matters which had not been acted upon during the regular session, including numerous incorporations, as well as to provide for the payment of the expenses of the constitutional convention which convened to draft the Constitution of the State of Minnesota roughly two weeks after the special session adjourned.

Party summary 
Resignations and new members are discussed in the "Membership changes" section, below.

Council

House of Representatives

Leadership 
President of the Council
John B. Brisbin (D-Saint Paul)

Speaker of the House
Joseph W. Furber (R-Cottage Grove)

Members

Council

House of Representatives

Membership changes

House of Representatives

Notes

References 

 Minnesota Legislators Past & Present - Session Search Results (Session 0.8, Senate)
 Minnesota Legislators Past & Present - Session Search Results (Session 0.8, House)

00.8th
1850s in Minnesota Territory
1857 establishments in Minnesota Territory